The Rudolf Weber-Arena (originally the Arena Oberhausen) is a multi-purpose arena, located in Oberhausen, Germany. Opening in 1996, the arena is a part of leisure and shopping center, CentrO. The venue was built in Neue Mitte Oberhausen, a former industrial plant. In November 2001, König Brauerei, a brewery in Duisburg purchased naming rights to the arena. In December 2021, the arena's naming rights were purchased by Essen-based cleaning company Rudolf Weber GmbH.

Configuration 
The maximum capacity of the arena is 12.650, where the seating is arranged on two levels. It is also possible to have a center stage configuration, 12.000 people can attend such events. There are also two possible theatre configurations with 3.000 and 5.200 capacity, respectively.

Naming history 
Arena Oberhausen (12 September 1996—31 December 2001)
König-Pilsener-Arena (1 January 2002—31 December 2021)
Rudolf Weber-Arena (1 January 2022—present)

Events 
The arena hosts a wide variety of events, with more than 800,000 people attending about a hundred events. The arena also hosts a variety of shows, e.g. Stomp or Riverdance. The König Pilsener Arena played host to UFC 122 on 13 November 2010.

Performers

A-ha
Chris Brown
Iron Maiden
Kiss
Rush
Judas Priest
Manowar
Amon Amarth
Arch Enemy
Sting
Page and Plant
Ronan Keating
Rod Stewart
Natalie Cole
Status Quo
Whitesnake
Def Leppard
Oasis
Dionne Warwick
Toni Braxton
Cliff Richard
Mark Knopfler
R.E.M.
Kylie Minogue
Alanis Morissette
Black Sabbath
Ozzy Osbourne
The Cure
André Rieu
Limp Bizkit
The Smashing Pumpkins
The Black Eyed Peas
Bryan Adams
Gloria Estefan
Toto
Placido Domingo
No Doubt
Prince & The New Power Generation
Roger Waters
David Gilmour
Neil Young
Dream Theater
Fleetwood Mac
The Corrs
Puff Daddy
Radiohead
Meat Loaf
Santana
Volbeat
Helene Fischer
Paul McCartney
Peter Gabriel
Backstreet Boys
Westlife
50 Cent
Britney Spears
Usher
Anastacia
Placebo
Journey
Within Temptation
Elton John
Bob Dylan
Coldplay
Foo Fighters
The BossHoss
The Who
Leonard Cohen
AC/DC
Taylor Swift
Five Finger Death Punch
Tori Amos
Lionel Richie
Pink
Shakira
Deep Purple
Scorpions
Queensrÿche
Nickelback
Thirty Seconds to Mars
Lenny Kravitz
Depeche Mode
Metallica
Machine Head (band)
Lady Gaga
Public Enemy
Kanye West
Justin Bieber
New Kids on the Block
Bruno Mars
Rihanna
Joe Cocker
Chris de Burgh
Supertramp
Simply Red
Take That
Die Fantastischen Vier
Christina Aguilera
Donots
Tokio Hotel
The Prodigy
Roxette
Alicia Keys
Ellie Goulding
Neil Diamond
Al Bano and Romina Power
Beyoncé
Whitney Houston
Sade
Chris Rea 
Jennifer Lopez
George Michael
Zucchero
Eros Ramazzotti
Tool
Eric Clapton
One Direction
Joe Cocker
Harry Belafonte
OneRepublic 
Sunrise Avenue 
Die Ärzte
Nicki Minaj during her third tour, The Pinkprint Tour
5 Seconds of Summer
Maroon 5
Runrig
Linkin Park
Die Toten Hosen
Imagine Dragons
Soy Luna Live
Nightwish
Sabaton (band)
Powerwolf
Harry Styles
Shawn Mendes
Jeff Lynne's ELO

See also
List of indoor arenas in Germany

References

External links 

Profile on DLA Designs
Profile on SMG Europe
Profile on baa projektmanagement GmbH

Indoor arenas in Germany
Buildings and structures in Oberhausen
Indoor ice hockey venues in Germany
Sports venues in North Rhine-Westphalia
Venues of the Bundesvision Song Contest
Tourist attractions in Oberhausen